Keansburg School District is a public school district based in Keansburg, New Jersey, United States, serving students in pre-kindergarten through twelfth grade. The district is one of 31 former Abbott districts statewide that were established pursuant to the decision by the New Jersey Supreme Court in Abbott v. Burke which are now referred to as "SDA Districts" based on the requirement for the state to cover all costs for school building and renovation projects in these districts under the supervision of the New Jersey Schools Development Authority.

As of the 2018–19 school year, the district, comprised of four schools, had an enrollment of 1,642 students and 185.0 classroom teachers (on an FTE basis), for a student–teacher ratio of 8.9:1.

The district is classified by the New Jersey Department of Education as being in District Factor Group "A", the lowest of eight groupings. District Factor Groups organize districts statewide to allow comparison by common socioeconomic characteristics of the local districts. From lowest socioeconomic status to highest, the categories are A, B, CD, DE, FG, GH, I and J.

Controversy
In May 2008, Governor Jon Corzine attempted to reduce a $740,000 retirement payout to outgoing superintendent Barbara Trzeszkowski. The package included nearly $185,000 for some 250 unused sick and vacation days, plus $556,290 in severance pay. The severance package, negotiated in a 2003 contract, awarded Trzeszkowski a payout calculated by multiplying her monthly salary by the 38 years she worked in the Keansburg district. The $740,000 amount, to be paid over a five-year period, would be paid out on top of Trzeszkowski's estimated $120,000 annual pension.

Schools
Schools in the district (with 2018–19 enrollment data from the National Center for Education Statistics) are:
Primary schools
Keansburg Preschool with 199 students in grade PreK
Joseph C. Caruso School with 668 students in grades K-4. At the start of the 2016–17 school year, the Port Monmouth Road School (which had 501 students in grades PreK - 2) was closed with the opening of the new Joseph C. Caruso School for grades K-4. The  school was constructed at a cost of $51 million.
Elyse McMahon, Principal
Sean Brophy, Assistant Principal
Joseph R. Bolger Middle School with 348 students in grades 6-8
Joseph Larocca, Principal
Vacant, Assistant Principal
High school
Keansburg High School with 384 students in grades 9-12
Michael John Herits, Principal
Brian Kmak, Assistant Principal

Administration
Core members of the district's administration are:
Kathleen O’Hare, Superintendent
Lindsey Case, Business Administrator/Board Secretary
Tara Smith, Supervisor of Special Education 
Thomas Stark, Athletic Director 
Christine Formica, Director of Curriculum and Instruction

Board of education
The district's board of education, comprised of nine members, sets policy and oversees the fiscal and educational operation of the district through its administration. As a Type II school district, the board's trustees are elected directly by voters to serve three-year terms of office on a staggered basis, with three seats up for election each year held (since 2012) as part of the November general election. The board appoints a superintendent to oversee the district's day-to-day operations and a business administrator to supervise the business functions of the district.

2022-2023 Board of Education members:
Brooke Clayton (2020-2023)
Vice President Michael Mankowski (2020-2023)
Ken Cook (2020-2023)
President Judy Ferraro (2021-2024)
Kim Kelaher-Moran (2021-2024)
Christopher J. Hoff (2021-2024)
Matthew C. Kitchen (2022-2025)
Gregory J. Siciliano (2022-2025)
Patricia Menture-Frizell (2022-2025)

References

External links
Keansburg School District
 
School Data for the Keansburg School District, National Center for Education Statistics

Keansburg, New Jersey
New Jersey Abbott Districts
New Jersey District Factor Group A
School districts in Monmouth County, New Jersey